Found Floating is a 1937 detective novel by the Irish writer Freeman Wills Crofts.  It is the sixteenth in his series of novels featuring Inspector French, a Scotland Yard detective  of the Golden Age known for his methodical technique.

References

Bibliography
 Evans, Curtis. Masters of the "Humdrum" Mystery: Cecil John Charles Street, Freeman Wills Crofts, Alfred Walter Stewart and the British Detective Novel, 1920-1961. McFarland, 2014.
 Herbert, Rosemary. Whodunit?: A Who's Who in Crime & Mystery Writing. Oxford University Press, 2003.
 Reilly, John M. Twentieth Century Crime & Mystery Writers. Springer, 2015.

1937 British novels
Novels by Freeman Wills Crofts
British crime novels
British mystery novels
British thriller novels
British detective novels
Hodder & Stoughton books
Irish mystery novels
Irish crime novels
Novels set in London
Novels set in Scotland
Novels set in Birmingham, West Midlands
Novels set in Spain